The 1965–66 Rheinlandliga was the 14th season of the highest amateur class of the Rhineland Football Association under the name of 1. Amateurliga Rheinland. It was a predecessor of today's Rheinlandliga.

Results
Rhineland champion was Germania Metternich. SSV Mülheim participated as a Rhineland representative in the German football amateur championship 1966, failed in the quarter finale against the Baden representative Amicitia Viernheim.

The relegation to the second amateur league was made by the newcomer SV Prüm and SV Niederlahnstein.

For the subsequent 1966–67 season, FC Horchheim, SV Ehrang and TuS Marienberg came up from the 2. Amateur league.

References

1966 in association football
Football in Rhineland-Palatinate
1965 in association football